Mehrunisa V Lub U is a 2017 Pakistani romantic socio-comedy film written and directed by Yasir Nawaz. The film was released on 26 June 2017. It was produced by Nida Yasir and Hassan Zia under the YNH Films production company and is distributed by Eveready Pictures and Urdu 1 Pictures. The film stars Danish Taimoor and Sana Javed.

Reviews of the film were mixed.  While some felt it was a colourful guilt-free family film released for Eid al-Fitr, others felt that there were too many dirty jokes and that better writing and direction could have helped convey its simple message of community stewardship.

Plot
Ali, a young Pakistani, returns from China to Karachi with gifts for his family and friends. He is in love with his childhood crush Mehru, the daughter of his father's friend, and a marriage alliance is made between their families. Meanwhile, Marzi, a local transgender don, seeks to buy out the neighbourhood in a scheme with a politician to profit from anticipated Chinese development in the area.

Newlyweds Ali and Mehru are unable to conceive a child. A doctor suggests that stress could be the reason, as Mehru has been unable to adjust to the city squalor and fears crime. Ali decides to let her stay at her father's home in the country, while deciding to improve his neighbourhood by changing the attitudes of its residents.

With his trusted friend Jani, Ali sets to convincing the community to improve their neighbourhood.  Some are resistant but early progress convinces them to keep the roads and buildings clean, if only as a facade.  Mehru realizes that Ali's neighbours are good people, and the revitalization leads to a news telecast of economic growth and financial stability.

Desperate to gain control of the block, Marzi rents an apartment and tries to create trouble with his goons. The politician kidnaps Mehru and demands  crore (30 million rupees) ransom from Ali. To raise the money, his neighbours sell their apartments to Marzi for a mere  lakhs (1 million rupees). Realizing the scheme, Ali and his friends rescue Mehru while the politician is holding a press conference, and expose his misdeeds to the media. Some time later, Ali and Mehru welcome their baby to a safe and clean neighbourhood.

Cast

 Danish Taimoor as Ali
 Sana Javed as Mehrunisa
 Saqib Sameer as Jani & Jani's father (dual role)
 Qavi Khan as Bunty (Ali's grandfather)
 Javed Sheikh as Mian Bhai
 Nida Mumtaz as Hajra
 Adnan Saeed as Zia
 Sarah Omair Siddique as Yasra
 Dr. Faraz Nawaz as Malik Shahab Shah
 Nayyer Ejaz as Marzi
 Arshad Mehmood as Dr. Najeeb (Mehrunisa's father)
 Laila Zuberi as Mariam (Mehrunisa's mother)
 Syed Mohammad Ahmed as Manzoor; a counsellor
 Hina Khawaja Bayat as a lady doctor
 Shamsudin as Malik
 Asma Khan as Mehek (stage drama dancer)
 Saira Ghaffar as Laali
 Khalid Nizami as Shafqoo Chacha
 Mirza Sethi as Chacha Kamal
 Waqar Hussain as Kareena
 Zain Nazar as Karishma
 Muhammad Ali Isani as Azhar (mechanic)
 Khawaja Saleem Ahmed as Khadim Ali (S.H.O)
 Chand Bawani as Bubbly
 Amna Ilyas (cameo in the song "Marhaba")
 Yasir Nawaz (cameo in the ending)

Production

On 24 January 2016, director Yasir Nawaz confirmed that he had started shooting for his new movie, Mehrunisa V Lub U. He selected Danish Taimoor to play the lead male role and Sana Javed to debut in the movie as the lead female.

The filming began in Karachi in late 2016, then moved to northern Pakistan. The film was shot in a span of 45 days.

Release
The film premiered on 23 June 2017 in Karachi and was released on 26 June, Eid al-Fitr, marking the end of Ramadan.

Critical reception
Reviews were mixed. Rafay Mahmood of The Express Tribune rated the film 3.5 out of 5 and said, "You take home a very important lesson and don't feel guilty for sitting through it."
Somia Ashraf of DAWN Images felt of the film's message, "its not the place that is bad but people, but perhaps with a better script and direction, the concept could have been highlighted better."
Shah Jahan Khurram of Samaa TV commented, "the plot of the film could have been better".

Fatima Awan of Review it rated it 2 out of 5 and called it "a typical masala film meant for people who enjoy dirty jokes" due to its "weak script and direction".
Ifrah Salman of Hip in Pakiatan rated it 3 out of 5 as "a colorful and vibrant film that's crisp" but that "the no-brain plot that fails to highlight the honest social taboo it tries to shed light upon."
Omair Alavi of Very Filmi felt there were conceptual mistakes: "some vulgarity scattered here and there to make a 'family entertainer' that is a big No-No for your family."
Syed Hashir Ali of Youlin Magazine commented, "an entertaining film, although there are moments when the timing of songs and jokes completely miss the mark".
Momin Ali Munshi of Galaxy Lollywood said, "the perfect 'massy' Eid entertainer for families to enjoy together."

Soundtrack

The music for the film was released by T-Series on 9 June 2017.

See also
 List of Pakistani films of 2017

References

External links

Pakistani romantic comedy films
2010s Urdu-language films
Films shot in Karachi
2017 films
Pakistani buddy films
2017 romantic comedy films